164th Division may refer to:

164th Division (1st Formation)(People's Republic of China)
164th Division (2nd Formation)(People's Republic of China)
164th Infantry Division (Wehrmacht)

Military units and formations disambiguation pages